Phelipe Megiolaro Alves (born 8 February 1999), commonly known as Phelipe Megiolaro, is a Brazilian professional footballer who plays as a goalkeeper and currently play for Vissel Kobe.

Club career

Grêmio
Born in Campinas, Brazil, Phelipe Megiolaro joined the Grêmio's Academy at the age of 13 in 2013, from Ponte Preta. On 5 December 2018, he signed a new contract with the club, until the end of 2020. Promoted to the main squad ahead of the 2019 season, Phelipe was mainly a third-choice behind Paulo Victor and Júlio César. On 19 October of that year, as the former was being rested for the 2019 Copa Libertadores semifinals and the latter was struggling with injuries, he made his first team – and Série A – debut by starting in a 2–1 away loss against Fortaleza.

FC Dallas
On 18 August 2020, it was announced that Megiolaro had signed for FC Dallas in Major League Soccer on loan until the end of the 2020 season.

Vissel Kobe
On 15 February 2023, Megiolaro abroad to Japan and announcement officially complete transfer to J1 club, Vissel Kobe for ahead of 2023 season.

International career
Phelipe Megiolaro represented Brazil with the under-20s in the 2017 Toulon Tournament. On 21 September 2018, he was called up to the full side by manager Tite for friendlies against Saudi Arabia and Argentina, but remained as an unused substitute.

Back at the under-20s, Phelipe Megiolaro was an undisputed starter during the 2019 South American U-20 Championship.

Career statistics

Club
.

International
.

Honours
Grêmio
Campeonato Gaúcho: 2019

References

External links

Profile at the FC Dallas website

1999 births
Living people
Sportspeople from Campinas
Brazilian footballers
Association football goalkeepers
Campeonato Brasileiro Série A players
Grêmio Foot-Ball Porto Alegrense players
FC Dallas players
Brazil youth international footballers
Major League Soccer players
Vissel Kobe players
J1 League players